In Greek mythology, the name Myrmidone may refer to:

Myrmidone, one of the Danaïdes, who married and killed Mineus, a son of Aegyptus.
Myrmidone of Lemnos, who killed Hypsipyle's two half-brothers, Cydon and Crenaeus, and Hypsipyle's fiancé Gyas on the night the Lemnian men were massacred by their women.

Notes

References 

 Gaius Julius Hyginus, Fabulae from The Myths of Hyginus translated and edited by Mary Grant. University of Kansas Publications in Humanistic Studies. Online version at the Topos Text Project.
 Publius Papinius Statius, The Thebaid translated by John Henry Mozley. Loeb Classical Library Volumes. Cambridge, MA, Harvard University Press; London, William Heinemann Ltd. 1928. Online version at the Topos Text Project.
 Publius Papinius Statius, The Thebaid. Vol I-II. John Henry Mozley. London: William Heinemann; New York: G.P. Putnam's Sons. 1928. Latin text available at the Perseus Digital Library.

Women in Greek mythology
Danaids
Characters in Greek mythology